Janette Husárová and Barbara Schett were the defending champions but only Schett competed that year with Silvia Farina.

Farina and Schett won in the final 2–6, 6–1, 6–4 against Florencia Labat and Mercedes Paz.

Seeds
Champion seeds are indicated in bold text while text in italics indicates the round in which those seeds were eliminated.

 Silvia Farina /  Barbara Schett (champions)
 Florencia Labat /  Mercedes Paz (final)
 Inés Gorrochategui /  Sandrine Testud (semifinals)
 Flora Perfetti /  Gloria Pizzichini (semifinals)

Draw

External links
 1997 Internazionali Femminili di Palermo Doubles Draw

Internazionali Femminili di Palermo
1997 WTA Tour